ServiceNation was a campaign of Be The Change, Inc., a 501(c)(3) organization based in Boston, Massachusetts. Its mission is to rekindle an ethic of civic responsibility in America through universal national service. ServiceNation's goal was to expand opportunities for Americans to spend a year in non-military national service such as AmeriCorps.  National service programs like Americorps pay a living stipend and reward volunteers who have completed service with a monetary education award.

In January 2016, ServiceNation merged with the Franklin Project at the Aspen Institute and the Service Year Exchange (which was incubated at the National Conference on Citizenship) to form Service Year Alliance.

History

ServiceNation was founded as a campaign of Be The Change, Inc. Be The Change creates national issue-based campaigns that work to solve society's greatest challenges and change the world.  It has two main campaigns: ServiceNation and Opportunity Nation. Both are driven by broad cross-partisan coalitions that inspire culture change and accelerate public policy development to bring about positive changes in our society.

Serve A Year Campaign
On March 23, 2015, in front of a crowd of 200 Hollywood executives, writers and producers, Chelsea Clinton and Jimmy Kimmel teamed up with ServiceNation to unveil an ambitious initiative aimed at convincing the youth of America to spend a year after high school or college serving in their communities through programs like AmeriCorps, a domestic version of the Peace Corps. Following the announcement of the "Serve a Year" campaign at the Jimmy Kimmel Live studio lot in Los Angeles, Clinton taped a segment for Kimmel's show that aired later that evening during Jimmy Kimmel Live!. The "Serve a Year" campaign is based on a similar initiative in which the Harvard School of Public Health worked with Hollywood writers to insert drunk driving messages — along with the term "Designated Driver" — into hit TV shows. With more than 160 primetime programs incorporating the concept into their content over a four-year period, the country saw a 30 percent decline in drunk driving fatalities between 1988 and 1994.

ServiceNation Summit

In 2008, Be The Change, Inc. partnered with Points of Light Institute, Civic Enterprises, and City Year to host a bipartisan summit on national service and civic engagement and was underwritten by AARP, the Carnegie Corporation of New York, Target Corporation, and Time magazine.  ServiceNation was launched at the summit, called the ServiceNation Presidential Candidates Forum and Summit, held on September 11–12, 2008 at Columbia University in New York City.

The Summit honored and featured the coalition of more than 300 organizations who support the vision of expanding national service opportunities. Notable attendees included: New York City mayor Michael Bloomberg, then-California Governor Arnold Schwarzenegger, then-Senator Hillary Clinton, Martin Luther King III, Robert F. Kennedy Jr, Queen Noor of Jordan, Caroline Kennedy, Wendy Kopp, Admiral Mike Mullen, then-Florida Governor Charlie Crist, and many others.

The main event was a forum attended by both 2008 presidential candidates, Senator John McCain and then-Senator Barack Obama, moderated by Richard Stengel, managing editor of Time magazine, with PBS NewsHour anchor Judy Woodruff.  New York's governor at the time, David Paterson, welcomed the audience. The forum showcased both candidates’ views on national service and civic engagement. McCain highlighted the public-private partnerships such as Teach For America that have been successful while Obama emphasized the importance of young people being part of something larger than themselves.

At the Summit, Senator Orrin Hatch (R-UT) and Caroline Kennedy, speaking on behalf of her uncle, Senator Ted Kennedy (D-MA) proposed legislation for expanding national service in America. Co-sponsored by Senators Hatch and Kennedy, the Edward M. Kennedy Serve America Act passed within the first 100 days of President Barack Obama's first term on April 21, 2009. ServiceNation was a strong advocate for the Edward M. Kennedy Serve America Act, which sanctions a significant increase in federal funding for nationwide service programs such as AmeriCorps.  This legislation was passed with bipartisan support by the Senate and House on March 30, 2009. It expanded national service, pledging to increase the number of AmeriCorps members to 250,000 by 2017, among other provisions. ServiceNation played a leading role in drafting and advocating for the passage of this legislation. At the summit, Senator Chris Dodd also unveiled two bills to promote community service among high school students and seniors.

After the summit, ServiceNation planned a Day of Action for September 27 in which organizers across the nation planned more than 2,300 activities. The Day of Action focused on people signing a Declaration of Service pledging to complete 50 hours of service in the next year.

Civilian military initiative
On Veteran's Day, November 11, 2009, ServiceNation launched a civilian-military initiative called Mission Serve to connect civilian and military communities through shared service and volunteerism. The Veteran's Day event was kicked off with First Lady Michelle Obama, Dr. Jill Biden, and Mrs. Alma Powell. Mission Serve launched with 36 newly formed civilian-military partnerships.

From 2009 to 2011, Mission Serve organized annual service events across the country on Veteran's Day that united civilian and military communities through service projects.  In 2011, notable participants included General Stanley A. McChrystal, Senator Lisa Murkowski, Yankees manager Joe Girardi, the cast of Hawaii Five-0, Brandon Routh, Megan Fox, Laird Hamilton, Gabby Reece, and many others. The centerpiece of the day was veterans and military families working with civilians to help other veterans in order to empower veterans.

In 2011, Be the Change and ServiceNation convened major Hollywood studios, networks, talent agencies, and guilds in the entertainment industry for a yearlong discussion of veteran's issues. The result was the industry signing on to an awareness and activation campaign called Got Your 6 to change the conversation about veterans and military families. The Mission Serve initiative evolved into this campaign and became Got Your 6.

Merger
In early 2012, ServeNext, a nonprofit launched in 2007 to advocate for national service programs like AmeriCorps through grassroots advocacy joined the umbrella of ServiceNation initiatives.

Leadership

Zach Maurin - Executive Director of ServiceNation
Alan Khazei - CEO of Be The Change, Inc. 
Rob Gordon - President of Be The Change, Inc.

Current priorities

As of April 2013, ServiceNation is pursuing several priorities: expanding national service, amending the GI Bill, and increasing awareness about national service in America.

In partnership with its sister campaign, Got Your 6, ServiceNation works to promote expansion of opportunities for veterans to continue to serve the nation. More than one million military service members will return to civilian life in the next five years and most are eligible for GI Bill benefits. However, only 36% use their benefits. Introducing the option of using part of GI Bill benefits to spend a year in service to the country will provide transition time as well as pathway to education and jobs.

ServiceNation also pursues expanding national service opportunities through grassroots advocacy. Full-time field organizers and volunteer district captains engage key supporters in targeted local areas to build support for national service.  These organizers and District Captains work with elected officials, the media, key decision makers, nonprofit partners, AmeriCorps Alums, and others to help educate about the value of national service.

ServiceNation Coalition

Since 2008, the ServiceNation Coalition has united organizations across the country who support universal national service and commit to using grassroots action to let elected officials and the nation's leaders know. More than 300 organizations are currently part of the coalition including national organizations and local affiliates.

Criticism

ServiceNation has been criticized by libertarians, National Review Editor Jonah Goldberg, and the John Birch Society.

Candidates Presidential Forum

Underwriter
Carnegie Corporation

Presenters
 Time (magazine)
 AARP
 Target

Co-sponsors
 Home Depot
 Peter G. Peterson Foundation

Participating sponsors
 Case Foundation
 Illumination Fund
 Bank of America
 Charina Endowment Fund

Media sponsor
 The NonProfit Times

Lead Social Media Partner
 Facebook

Organizers
 Be the Change, Inc.
 City Year
 Civic Enterprise, LLC
 Points of Light Institute

Prominent members of the Leadership Council

Co-chairs
 Vartan Gregorian, president, Carnegie Corporation of New York
 Caroline Kennedy, vice-chair, New York City Fund For Public Schools
 Bill Novelli, CEO, AARP
 Alma Powell, chair, America's Promise Alliance
 Rick Stengel, managing editor, TIME magazine

Council
 Andi Bernstein
 Tom A. Bernstein, president and co-founder, Chelsea Piers
 Michael R. Bloomberg, mayor, New York, NY; chairman, National September 11 Memorial and Museum
 Cory Booker, mayor, Newark, NJ
 Richard H. Brodhead, president, Duke University
 Neil Bush, CEO, Global XS
 Geoffrey Canada, president and CEO, Harlem Children's Zone
 Mortimer Caplin, former commissioner, Internal Revenue Service
 Vice Admiral Richard Carmona, former U.S. Surgeon General
 Jean Case, CEO, The Case Foundation
 Richard Celeste, president, Colorado College
 Ray Chambers, Amelior Foundation
 Richard Cizik, vice president, National Association of Evangelicals
 Henry Cisneros, chairman, CityView; former U.S. Secretary of Housing and Urban Development
 Glenn Close, actress
 William Cohen, former Secretary of Defense; former U.S. Senator
 Janet Langhart Cohen, author; founder, Citizen Patriot Organization
 Scott Cowen, president, Tulane University
 Tom Daschle, former U.S. Senator
 John J. DeGioia, president, Georgetown University
 Manny Diaz, mayor, Miami, FL
 John DiIulio, former director, Office of Faith*Based and Community Initiatives; author, The Godly Republic
 Melinda Doolittle, recording artist
 Paul Fireman, founder, Reebok
 Al From, founder and CEO, Democratic Leadership Council
 Susan Fuhrman, president, Teachers College, Columbia University
 Mark Gearan, president, Hobart and William Smith Colleges
 David Gergen, professor of public service and director, Center for Public Leadership, Harvard University
 Michael Gerson, columnist, The Washington Post
 Stephen Goldsmith, former mayor, Indianapolis, IN
 Robert L. Gordon III, former Deputy Under Secretary of Defense, Military Community and Family Policy
 Jennifer Granholm, governor, Michigan
 Rabbi Irving Greenberg, theologian; author, The Jewish Way; Founding President, Jewish Life Network
 Amy Gutmann, president, University of Pennsylvania
 Lee H. Hamilton, former Congressman; former co-chair, 9/11 Commission and Iraq Study Group
 Jenny Chin Hansen, president, AARP
 Gary Hart, former U.S. Senator
 Mellody Hobson, president, Ariel Investments
 Admiral James R. Hogg, USN (Ret), director, Strategic Studies Group, Naval War College
 James J. Jensen
 Martin Luther King, III, chairman, Realizing the Dream
 Joel Klein, chancellor, New York City Public Schools
 Sherry Lansing, founder, The Sherry Lansing Foundation
 Jim Leach, former Congressman; John L. Weinberg Professor of Public and International Affairs, Woodrow Wilson School, Princeton University
 Anthony Marx, president, Amherst College
 Bonnie McElveen-Hunter, chairman, American Red Cross
 Sam Nunn, former U.S. Senator
 Michael Nutter, mayor, Philadelphia, PA
 Martin O'Malley, governor, Maryland
 Bette Midler, founder, New York Restoration Project; Performance Artist
 Lt. General Dave Richard Palmer, USA (Ret), former superintendent, U.S. Military Academy at West Point;    author
 David Paterson, governor, New York
 Kal Penn, actor
 Gregg Petersmeyer, former assistant to the president; director, Office of National Service under George H.W. Bush
 Peter G. Peterson, chairman, Peter G. Peterson Foundation; co-founder, Blackstone Group Management
 Rob Portman, former Congressman; former director, Office of Management and Budget
 Samantha Power, Anna Lindh Professor of Practice of Global Leadership and Public Policy, Harvard University; author
 Marc Racicot, former governor, Montana
 Susan Rice, foreign policy advisor, Obama for America
 Bill Richardson, governor, New Mexico
 David Shaw, managing partner, Black Point Group
 Rodney Slater, former secretary of Transportation; chair, United Way of America
 Laurie M. Tisch, president, Laurie M. Tisch Illumination Fund
 Paul Vallas, superintendent, New Orleans Recovery School District
 David Walker, president and CEO, Peter G. Peterson Foundation
 Silda Wall, founder, Children For Children
 Rick Warren, senior pastor, Saddleback Church; author, A Purpose Driven Life
 Harris Wofford, former U.S. Senator; former CEO, Corporation for National & Community Service

References

External links
 ServiceNation
 ServiceNation Presidential Candidates Forum (transcript 
 video)

International volunteer organizations
Year of establishment missing